Leopoldo Ramos Giménez was a libertarian anarchist and poet from Paraguay.

He was a prominent critic of mensú yerba mate plantation worker treatment, and was wounded in an assassination attempt in 1916.

Selected works 

 Piras sagradas, Asunción, 1917 - (Sacred pyres)
 Eros, Asunción, 1918 - (Eros)
 Alas y sombras, Buenos Aires, 1919 - (Wings and shadows)
 Cantos del solar heroico, Asunción, 1920 - (Heroic songs of the sun)
 Canto a las palmeras de Río de Janeiro, Río de Janeiro, 1932. - (Song of the palms of Rio de Janeiro) Collection of de verses.
 Tabla de sangre, libro de combate, contra el régimen de esclavitud imperante en los yerbales y obrajes del Alto Paraná, Asunción, 1919 - (Table of blood, book of combat against the regime of slavery prevailing in the mate plantations  mills of Alto Parana)
 La bestia blanca, Asunción, 1919 - (The white beast)
 En el centenario del mariscal López, polémica histórica, San Pablo, 1927 - (In the centenary of Marshal López, historical controversy)
 La yerba mate, Asunción, 1931 - (The yerba matte)
 El Brasil, su desarrollo económico-industrial, Río de Janeiro, 1932 - (Brazil, its economic and industrial development)
 Siembra blanca, campaña de aproximación paraguayo-brasilera, Río de Janeiro, 1932 - (White Sowing, Paraguayan-Brazilian campaign approach)
 El hierro y otros metales en el Paraguay - (Iron and other metals in Paraguay)
 Historia cartográfica del Chaco, Buenos Aires, 1935 - (Cartographic history of the Chaco)
 El Chaco Boreal en la historia y en nuestros días, Buenos Aires, 1934 - (The Boreal Chaco in history and today)

References

1891 births
1988 deaths
People from Villarrica, Paraguay
Paraguayan male writers
Paraguayan journalists
Male journalists
Paraguayan Marxists
Paraguayan anarchists
20th-century journalists
20th-century Paraguayan poets